Arsenio Snijders (born 20 June 1990 in Amsterdam) is a Dutch former professional footballer who played as a forward for Eerste Divisie club FC Omniworld from 2008 to 2010.

References

External links
 

Living people
1990 births
Dutch footballers
Footballers from Amsterdam
Association football forwards
Eerste Divisie players
Almere City FC players